Sparkle Hard is the seventh studio album by American indie rock band Stephen Malkmus and the Jicks, released on May 18, 2018, by Matador Records and Domino Records. It reached #174 on the Billboard 200 charts, and peaked at #64 on the Official UK Charts.

Critical reception

Sparkle Hard was critically acclaimed upon its release. At Metacritic, which assigns a normalized rating out of 100 to reviews from mainstream publications, it received an average score of 84, based on 26 reviews. Jem Aswad of Variety said that "With nary a weak track, Sparkle Hard finds Malkmus hitting a new peak nearly 30 years into his career."

Several publications named the album one of the best of 2018, including: Rolling Stone, Spin, Q, Uncut, Mojo, Under the Radar, and Consequence of Sound.

Track listing

Personnel

 Stephen Malkmus – vocals, songwriting, guitar, mellotron, piano, Memorymoog, bass
 Joanna Bolme – bass, backing vocals
 Mike Clark – keyboards, JUNO synthesizer
 Jake Morris – drums, backing vocals, percussion
 Chris Funk – production, acoustic slide guitar 
 Kim Gordon – vocals 
 Kyleen King – strings 
 Luke Price – fiddle 
 JJ Golden – lacquer cut
 Adam Lee – recording, mixing
 Orion Landau – design
 James Rexroad – photography

References

2018 albums
Stephen Malkmus albums
Domino Recording Company albums
Matador Records albums